William 'Wim' Boissevain (born 23 July 1927) is an Australian painter of Dutch extraction born Willem Geoffrey Boissevain in New York, son of Gideon Walrave 'Gi' Boissevain who was in the Dutch diplomatic service.

He studied at the Central School of Arts and Crafts, London and the École nationale supérieure des Beaux-Arts, Paris.

He arrived in Australia in 1947, became naturalised in 1949, and has established a studio at Glen Forrest in the Darling Range near Perth.

From 1951 to 1955 he taught drawing and French at Wesley College, Perth, later at Perth Technical College.

His portrait of the art dealer and benefactor Claude Hotchin was an entry in the 1957 Archibald Prize.

Since 1964, he has held exhibitions in many major galleries in Perth (commencing with the Skinner Gallery) and Sydney. His paintings are avidly sought by collectors. His portrait of Sir James Alexander Forrest is held in the National Portrait Gallery in Canberra.

His first wife Rhoda Elsie Boissevain (born 27 July 1918), also a fine portrait painter, was runner-up in the Rubinstein Prize for portraiture 1960. She also taught at Perth Technical College in the 1960s. The National Library of Australia holds her portrait of Katharine Susannah Prichard, completed ca. 1955.

Awards
 Rubinstein Prize for portraiture 1956
 Claude Hotchin Art Prize, 1959
 Perth Prize for Drawing International, Perth, Western Australia, 1971
 He was awarded an Order of the British Empire (OBE) in 1978 for his services to the advancement of art.

Bibliography

 Addenbrooke, Maureen (illustrations by Wim Boissevain) Killing Cats and Karma Artlook Books Perth, W.A. 1983

References

Sources
McCulloch, Alan Encyclopedia of Australian Art Hutchinson of London 1968

1927 births
Australian painters
Living people